Yauheni Zharnasek (born 9 August 1987 in Lepiel), also known as Yevgeny Zhernosek, is a Belarusian weightlifter. He competed at the 2012 Summer Olympics in the +105 kg event. In October 2016, the IOC disqualified him from the 2012 Olympics and annulled his result after his Olympic doping sample was retested and failed.

References

External links
 
 
 

1987 births
Living people
Belarusian male weightlifters
Olympic weightlifters of Belarus
Weightlifters at the 2012 Summer Olympics
Doping cases in weightlifting
Belarusian sportspeople in doping cases
20th-century Belarusian people
21st-century Belarusian people